At the 1952 Summer Olympics in Helsinki, 33 athletics events were contested, 24 for men and 9 for women. There were a total number of 963 participating athletes from 57 countries.

Medal summary

Men

Women

Records broken 
During the 1952 Summer Olympic Games, 26 new Olympic records and 8 new world records were set in the athletics events.

Men's Olympic and world records

Women's Olympic and world records

Medal table

Participating nations
A total of 57 nations participated in the different Athletics events at the 1952 Summer Olympics.

References
1952 Summer Olympics results: athletics, from https://www.sports-reference.com/; retrieved 2010-11-08.
International Olympic Committee results database
Athletics Australia

 
1952 Summer Olympics events
O
1952
1952 Olympics